Butler is a town in Custer County, Oklahoma, United States. The population was 287 at the 2010 census.

Geography
Butler is located in western Custer County at the intersection of state highways 33 and 44. Highway 44 leads south from Butler  to Foss and Interstate 40.

Climate

Demographics

As of the census of 2000, there were 345 people, 138 households, and 104 families residing in the town. The racial makeup of the town was 89.28% White, 0.87% Native American, 0.29% Asian, 4.93% from other races, and 4.64% from two or more races. Hispanic or Latino of any race were 11.88% of the population.

There were 138 households, out of which 28.3% had children under the age of 18 living with them, 59.4% were married couples living together, 13.0% had a female householder with no husband present, and 24.6% were non-families. 21.7% of all households were made up of individuals, and 11.6% had someone living alone who was 65 years of age or older. The average household size was 2.50 and the average family size was 2.88.

In the town, the population was spread out, with 24.1% under the age of 18, 7.2% from 18 to 24, 25.2% from 25 to 44, 27.0% from 45 to 64, and 16.5% who were 65 years of age or older. The median age was 40 years. For every 100 females, there were 84.5 males. For every 100 females age 18 and over, there were 94.1 males.

The median income for a household in the town was $29,375, and the median income for a family was $32,083. Males had a median income of $25,500 versus $24,583 for females. The per capita income for the town was $13,917. About 18.4% of families and 29.8% of the population were below the poverty line, including 51.5% of those under age 18 and 7.0% of those age 65 or over.

References

External links
 Encyclopedia of Oklahoma History and Culture - Butler

Towns in Custer County, Oklahoma
Towns in Oklahoma